Mattke Field at the Regional Events Center is a college football stadium on the campus of Southwest Minnesota State University (SMSU).

Mattke Field had a seating capacity of 5,000 prior to 2008 and it has been the home field of the SMSU Mustangs since 1971. Construction began in 1970, and it was complete in 1974.  It was originally named SSU Field. 

On September 28, 1985, the stadium was renamed after Glenn Mattke. He had worked with the SMSU athletic department since its founding in 1968 and was the athletic direct from 1970 to 1985.  Lights were added in 1997. The stadium was rebuilt after the 2007 season and opened in 2008 as the Regional Events Center. The new capacity is around 2,500 and features an artificial surface.

External links
Event Center

Sports venues in Minnesota
College football venues
Southwest Minnesota State University
Buildings and structures in Lyon County, Minnesota
Sports venues completed in 1974
1974 establishments in Minnesota
American football venues in Minnesota